Antonio Ghomsi (born 22 April 1986) is a Cameroonian former footballer who played as a left-back.

Biography
Ghomsi started his career at Genoa. In July 2006, he was signed by Messina of Serie A. He made his Serie A debut on 1 October against Livorno. In summer 2007 he left for Juve Stabia of Serie C1. He became a free agent after Messina bankrupted in July 2008. In October 2008, he was signed by Avellino of Serie B on free transfer.

In July 2009, he was signed by A.C. Siena of Serie A. and pending a loan deal to K.V. Mechelen. He made his Belgian First Division debut on 1 August 2009, K.V. Mechelen 4–1 won K.V.C. Westerlo.

References

External links

 Voetbal International profile 

1986 births
Living people
Cameroonian footballers
Association football defenders
Genoa C.F.C. players
U.S. Salernitana 1919 players
A.C. Perugia Calcio players
A.C.R. Messina players
S.S. Juve Stabia players
U.S. Avellino 1912 players
K.V. Mechelen players
FC Dinamo București players
Serie A players
Serie B players
Belgian Pro League players
Liga I players
Cameroonian expatriate footballers
Expatriate footballers in Italy
Expatriate footballers in Belgium
Expatriate footballers in Romania
Olympic footballers of Cameroon
Footballers at the 2008 Summer Olympics